Raay may refer to:

Carla van Raay (born 1938), Australian author, counselor and former nun, teacher and call girl
Raay (musician), Slovenian musician, part of the duo Maraaya alongside Marjetka Vovk